In geometry, the order-7 truncated triangular tiling, sometimes called the hyperbolic soccerball, is a semiregular tiling of the hyperbolic plane. There are two hexagons and one heptagon on each vertex, forming a pattern similar to a conventional soccer ball (truncated icosahedron) with heptagons in place of pentagons. It has Schläfli symbol of t{3,7}.

Hyperbolic soccerball (football) 
This tiling is called a hyperbolic soccerball (football) for its similarity to the truncated icosahedron pattern used on soccer balls. Small portions of it as a hyperbolic surface can be constructed in 3-space.

Dual tiling 
The dual tiling is called a heptakis heptagonal tiling, named for being constructible as a heptagonal tiling with every heptagon divided into seven triangles by the center point.

Related tilings 
This hyperbolic tiling is topologically related as a part of sequence of uniform truncated polyhedra with vertex configurations (n.6.6), and [n,3] Coxeter group symmetry.

From a Wythoff construction there are eight hyperbolic uniform tilings that can be based from the regular heptagonal tiling. 

Drawing the tiles colored as red on the original faces, yellow at the original vertices, and blue along the original edges, there are 8 forms.

In popular culture 

This tiling features prominently in HyperRogue.

See also 

 Triangular tiling
 Order-3 heptagonal tiling
 Order-7 triangular tiling
 Tilings of regular polygons
 List of uniform tilings

References

 John H. Conway, Heidi Burgiel, Chaim Goodman-Strass, The Symmetries of Things 2008,  (Chapter 19, The Hyperbolic Archimedean Tessellations)

External links 

 Hyperbolic and Spherical Tiling Gallery
 KaleidoTile 3: Educational software to create spherical, planar and hyperbolic tilings
 Hyperbolic Planar Tessellations, Don Hatch
 Geometric explorations on the hyperbolic football by Frank Sottile

Hyperbolic tilings
Isogonal tilings
Order-7 tilings
Semiregular tilings
Triangular tilings
Truncated tilings